Tritonaclia tollini is a moth in the subfamily Arctiinae. It was described by Georg Adolf Keferstein in 1870. It is found in Madagascar.

References

Natural History Museum Lepidoptera generic names catalog

Moths described in 1870
Arctiinae